Le Bain de Diane (The Bath of Diana) is a French 1550s painting attributed to François Clouet, located in the Musée des Beaux-Arts, Rouen. According to Eckhardt Knab, writing in The Dictionary of Art, it is an example of an allegorical landscape and refers to the marriage of Francis II and Mary Stuart, who is depicted as Diana in the painting. It reveals the influence of Rosso Fiorentino, Francesco Primaticcio, and Nicolo dell'Abate, but tempers the overdrawn Mannerist bodily forms of these artists from the first School of Fontainebleau, while the landscape reflects the influence of Giorgione and the early Titian.

Notes

Bibliography
 Blunt, Anthony (1953). Art and Architecture in France 1500-1700. London: Penguin Books. .
 Knab, Eckhart (1996). "François Clouet", vol. 7, pp. 464–466, in The Dictionary of Art, 34 volumes, edited by Jane Turner. New York: Grove. .

1550s paintings
Paintings by François Clouet
Works about adolescence
Nude art